David Johnston is president of What's Working, a design and consulting firm in Boulder, Colorado that specializes in environmental construction technology. For over 25 years, Johnston has been encouraging the building industry to focus more attention on sustainability and become "greener". He was responsible for the commercialization of passive solar technology and the integration of it into residential building, largely through industry trade organization activities.

Career
Johnston studied with Buckminster Fuller at Southern Illinois University, graduating with a degree in Environmental Systems Design. Johnston has consulted with the US Department of Energy, the International Energy Agency, Alameda County (California), as well as private architects, builders, and homeowners in energy-efficient, and "environmentally friendly" housing.

In 1983 he founded LightWorks Construction in Bethesda, Maryland, a company that specialized in solar installations and later expanding into general remodeling for new-home and commercial projects. A decade later he sold the company and moved to Boulder, Colorado drawn by the culture of sustainable living. He founded a new company, What's Working, to offer green consulting and training.

He is a past director of the Boulder Home Builder's Association and co-author of the Green Builder Certification Program. He founded the Passive Solar Industries Council in Washington, DC and co-founded the California Build It Green program.  Johnston is also an instructor for the Green Advantage Environmental Certification Program. Johnston worked for the Boulder Daily Camera for four years as a columnist and also worked for Cahners “Construct” magazine as a senior editor.

Recognition
 2008 Lifetime Achievement Award, Boulder Green Building Guild
 2007 Sustainability Pioneer Award from SAM International recognizing Johnston's traceable impact on promoting sustainability.
 2005 Nautilus Book Award for his book Green Remodeling
 2004 Environmental Hero Award, Interior and Sources Magazine
 2004 Corporate Excellence Award, University of Colorado
 2004 American Institute of Architects Colorado, Contribution to the Built Environment
 2003 Sustainable Community Development Award, Sustainable Buildings Industry Council
 2002 Our World Award, Rotary International
 1989 Top 50 Contractors in the US, Remodeling magazine
 1988 NOVA Award, Boulder Community Foundation
 1996 Environmental Business of the Year, Boulder Chamber of Commerce
 1995-96 Hall of Fame, Denver Homebuilders Association

Publications
Johnston is the author and co-author of books on Green Building:
Toward a Zero Energy Home: A complete guide to energy self-sufficiency at home with Scott Gibson (Paperback - Taunton Press April 27, 2010) 
 Green from the Ground Up: Sustainable, Healthy, and Energy-Efficient Home Construction with Scott Gibson (Paperback - Taunton Press April 1, 2008) 
Green Remodeling: Changing the World One Room at a Time with Kim Master (Paperback - New Society Publishers Sep 1, 2004) , which won the 2005 Nautilus Award.
Building Green in a Black and White World (Paperback - Home Builders Press January 2000) 

Johnston regularly contributes to major building publications and has had articles published in:
Fine Homebuilding
Custom Builder
Professional Builder
Qualified Remodeler
Remodeling Magazine
Renovation Style Magazine
Environmental Health Perspectives Journal
as well as newspapers including The Washington Post, The New York Times, The Wall Street Journal, The Chicago Tribune, The Los Angeles Times, The San Francisco Chronicle and many other local newspapers.

References

External links
 WhatsWorking.com
 GreenAdvantage.org

21st-century American engineers
Southern Illinois University alumni
Year of birth missing (living people)
Living people
Businesspeople from Boulder, Colorado